Presidential elections were held in Colombia on 14 February 1926. The result was a victory for Miguel Abadía Méndez of the Conservative Party, who received 99.9% of the vote. He took office on 7 August.

Results

References

Presidential elections in Colombia
1926 in Colombia
Colombia
February 1926 events
Election and referendum articles with incomplete results